Get Rich Click!: The Ultimate Guide to Making Money on the Internet (2011) is a New York Times best-selling business book written by Marc Ostrofsky, an American writer, business owner, and serial entrepreneur. The book was published on May 2, 2011 by Razor Media Group.

Synopsis
In Get Rich Click!, Ostrofsky attempts distill a variety of internet based business models into different internet industries. The book includes chapters on different internet industries, such as e-commerce, search, advertising, affiliate marketing, domain names, and social media.

The book also contains case studies from successful internet entrepreneurs in many of the aforementioned internet industries.  In an effort to bridge the virtual and physical world, the majority of these case studies contain QR codes which take a reader to a video interview with the people featured in the case studies.

Furthermore, each chapter contains Ostrofsky’s own views on how to profit in various internet industries.

Awards/Recognition
New York Times Bestseller
Wall Street Journal Bestseller
USAToday Bestseller
Shortly after the book was released, Get Rich Click! was featured on The View because of high sales volume.

Testimonials
The book contains endorsements by Steve Wozniak, Jack Canfield, Stephen Covey, David Bach, and Brian Tracy.

References

2011 non-fiction books
Business books
Self-help books
American non-fiction books